Tatyana Konstantinova may refer to:
 Tatyana Konstantinova (athlete) (born 1970), Russian retired hammer thrower
 Tatyana Konstantinova (handballer) (born 1984), team handball player from Kazakhstan